Trigonurus is a genus of rove beetles in the family Staphylinidae, the only family of the subfamily Trigonurinae. There are about nine described species in Trigonurus, found in the Holarctic.

Species
These nine species belong to the genus Trigonurus:
 Trigonurus asiaticus Reiche, 1865
 Trigonurus bruzasi Hatch, 1957 i c g
 Trigonurus caelatus LeConte, 1874 i c g
 Trigonurus crotchii LeConte, 1874 i c g
 Trigonurus dilaticollis VanDyke, 1934 i c g
 Trigonurus edwardsi Sharp, 1875 i c g b
 Trigonurus mellyi Mulsant, 1847 g
 Trigonurus rugosus Sharp, 1875 i c g b
 Trigonurus sharpi Blackwelder, 1941 i c g b
Data sources: i = ITIS, c = Catalogue of Life, g = GBIF, b = Bugguide.net

References

Further reading

External links

 

Staphylinidae
Articles created by Qbugbot